Antoine Mourre was a French racecar driver.

Indy 500 results

References

French racing drivers
Indianapolis 500 drivers
Year of birth missing
Year of death missing